Alison Scott (born 8 February 1968) is an Australian former professional tennis player.

Biography
Scott grew up in Canberra and developed her tennis at the Australian Institute of Sport on a scholarship, before going on to compete on the WTA Tour. She was a girls' doubles finalist at the 1985 Australian Open.

As a professional player she reached the top 100 in doubles, peaking at 93 in the world in 1988. She featured in the doubles main draws of all four grand slam tournaments, with her best performance a quarter-final appearance at the 1988 Australian Open, partnering Maria Lindström.

ITF finals

Doubles: 10 (2–8)

References

External links
 
 

1968 births
Living people
Australian female tennis players
Tennis people from the Australian Capital Territory
Australian Institute of Sport tennis players
20th-century Australian women